Ayesha Gulalai Wazir is a Pakistani politician who was a former Member of the National Assembly of Pakistan from 2013 to May 2018.

Early life and education
Ayesha Gulalai was born in Bannu domel and received her master's degree from the University of Peshawar.

After graduating, she briefly worked as a journalist, first as a Pashto newscaster at the PTV in Peshawar and later at The News International.

She is the sister of Maria Toorpakay.

Political career
Wazir began her political career as a human rights activist from Bannu domel. She was a worker of Pakistan Peoples Party Parliamentarians (PPPP) as coordinator for the women's wing in Federally Administered Tribal Areas. She also has been a member of the All Pakistan Muslim League (APML). It was reported that PPPP was considering to give her a party ticket in 2008 Pakistani general election to run for the seat of National Assembly, but she could not compete due to the age issue.

In 2012, she joined Pakistan Tehreek-e-Insaf (PTI) and was nominated as a member of the PTI central committee. Wazir was indirectly elected to the National Assembly of Pakistan as a candidate of PTI on a reserved seat for women from the FATA in 2013 Pakistani general election. She became first-ever female Member of the National Assembly from FATA as well one of the youngest member of the parliament.

She quit PTI in August 2017, accusing that the party does not guarantee respect and dignity to women. She has blamed Imran Khan for inappropriate text messages sent to her in October, 2013. She also refused to resign from the seat in the National Assembly.

In February 2018, she launched her own party Pakistan Tehreek-e-Insaf (Gulalai) (PTI-G), as a faction of PTI. The election commission of Pakistan allotted the racket as electoral sign to PTI-G. The party supports presidential form of democracy.

For 2018 Pakistani general election, PTI-G gave tickets to four transgender persons to contest elections.

Wazir ran for the seat of the National Assembly as a candidate of PTI-G from Constituency NA-25 (Nowshera-I), Constituency NA-53 (Islamabad-II), Constituency NA-161 (Lodhran-II) and from Constituency NA-231 (Sujawal) in 2018 Pakistani general election but was unsuccessful and lost from all four seats.

In May 2019, Gulalai asked Bilawal Bhutto Zardari to merge his party (PPP) with PTI-G as she thought it had already been reduced to one province.

In 2018 General Elections, PTI-G could only secure  4,130 votes in National Assembly and 1,235 in Provincial Assembly. None of the party's candidates were able to win in any constituency.

References

Living people
Year of birth missing (living people)
Pakistani MNAs 2013–2018
Pakistani political party founders
Women members of the National Assembly of Pakistan
People from South Waziristan
Pashtun women
University of Peshawar alumni
Pakistan Tehreek-e-Insaf MNAs
21st-century Pakistani women politicians